Martina Navratilova and Anne Smith were the defending champions, but Navratilova chose not to participate. Smith partnered with Kathy Jordan, but lost in the final to Rosalyn Fairbank and Candy Reynolds, 7–5, 5–7, 2–6.

Draw

Finals

Top half

Section 1

Section 2

Bottom half

Section 3

Section 4

References
1983 French Open – Women's draws and results at the International Tennis Federation

Women's Doubles
French Open by year – Women's doubles
1983 in women's tennis
1983 in French women's sport